The 1930 San Jose State Spartans football team represented State Teachers College at San Jose during the 1930 college football season.

San Jose State competed in the Far Western Conference (FWC). The team was led by second-year head coach Mush Crawford, and they played home games at Spartan Field in San Jose, California. The team finished the season with a record of two wins, three losses and three ties (2–3–3, 1–2–1 FWC). The Spartans were outscored by their opponents 50–79 for the season, and were shut out in five of the eight games.

Schedule

Notes

References

San Jose State
San Jose State Spartans football seasons
San Jose State Spartans football